The 2012–13 Liga I was the ninety-fifth season of Liga I, the top-level football league of Romania. The season began on 21 July 2012 and ended on 30 May 2013. CFR Cluj were the defending champions.

Since Romania dropped from 14th to 22nd place in the UEFA association coefficient rankings at the end of the 2011–12 season, the league has lost its second UEFA Champions League berth. Further, all teams who will qualify for a European competition via league placement at the end of this season will have to enter these a round earlier as in the season before. The champions will enter the second qualifying round of the 2013–14 UEFA Champions League, while the second- and third-placed teams will begin at the second and first qualifying rounds, respectively, of the 2013–14 UEFA Europa League. In addition, the winners of the 2012–13 Cupa României will also start in the second qualifying round of the Europa League, two rounds earlier than before.

Teams
Four teams from the 2011–12 season were relegated to their respective 2012–13 Liga II division, Târgu Mureș, Mioveni, Voința Sibiu, and Sportul Studențesc București.

Four teams, two from each division, were promoted from 2011–12 Liga II. From the Seria I, CSMS Iași and Viitorul Constanța gained the access because they finished first and second in the standings. From Seria II, the promoted teams where Gloria Bistrița and Turnu Severin. Politehnica Timișoara won their promotion place in the field, but they did not receive their licence for the first league, so the Romanian Football Federation decided that the third team in the division, Turnu Severin, should promote instead.

Team FC Astra Ploiești were renamed FC Astra Giurgiu, effective to 1 July 2012.

Venues

Personnel and kits

Note: Flags indicate national team as has been defined under FIFA eligibility rules. Players and Managers may hold more than one non-FIFA nationality.

Managerial changes

League table

Positions by round

Results

Top goalscorers

1 Marius Niculae was transferred to Shandong Luneng during the winter transfer window.

Champion squad

Statistics

Scoring
First goal of the season:  John Ibeh (Pandurii Târgu Jiu) against Universitatea Cluj
Hat-tricks of the season:
 Hamza Younés (Petrolul Ploiești) against Ceahlăul Piatra Neamț (stage 1)
 George Țucudean (Dinamo București) against CSMS Iași (4 goals, stage 2)
 Mirko Ivanovski (Astra Giurgiu) against Concordia Chiajna (stage 6)
 Marius Niculae (Vaslui) against Concordia Chiajna (stage 10)
 Marius Onofraș (CSMS Iași) against Oțelul Galați (stage 18)
 Marius Pena (Oțelul Galați) against Rapid București (stage 19)
 Robert Maah (CFR Cluj) against Universitatea Cluj (stage 34)

References

External links

 Official website

Liga I seasons
Romania
1